The Kumam  are a Nilo-Hamitic ethnic group of about 349,000 living mainly in the western areas of Teso sub-region and the south-east of Lango sub-region. The Kumam are an ethnic group of people found in Kaberamaido district, district in Eastern Uganda.  They share Soroti district with the Iteso and some parts of formerly Lira district with the Langi. In the Lango region, they are now found in Dokolo district which was detached from Lira District. They are found at the shores of Lake Kyoga (Namasale). In Soroti district, they are found in Serere, Asuret,Kamuda, katine, Soroti city, Arapai as well as the outskirts of Soroti district neighboring Kaberamaido.

They speak Kumam language similar to the language spoken by the Lango, with some Ateso vocabulary.

Origin 
The Kumam descend from the early fishing, agricultural, and herding communities of Ethiopia. Who migrated southwards towards Uganda because of land pressure around the 17th century. Today, they live on the shores of Lake Kyoga in the districts of Serere, Soroti and Kaberamaido

Kumam traditions say are part of the Iteso people. They probably lost their Eastern Nilotic Ateker language and took up the Western Nilotic Luo spoken by their Lango and Acholi neighbours – due to prolonged contact and  intermarriages. The Kumam must have proceded the ITeso in migration and settled in Soroti later hence, the Karimojong people from whom Iteso came know Soroti by the name 'Solot' and not teso.This points to the possibility of a later migration after iteso from Karamoja.

Culture and customs

Political set-up 
The Kumam had political structure under clan leaders known as wegi Atekerin. Other people of importance in the society were wegi ikodeta Cel (leaders of dancing groups), and leaders of Asonya(ancient) homes, wegi Cel. The wegi Cel were in most cases Dogolan or Odonge ikekoros (heads of part of a clan descending form one man). These clan leaders were responsible for the maintenance of law and order as well as general administration. They arbitrated in matters of politics and social affairs.

Social set-up 
Music, dance and story telling played a big part in kumam lifestyle. At any time music would be made, at various functions, such as ceremonial, religious and political functions. In the evening, the old people would narrate stories to the younger generation as part of the oral traditions.

Marriage 
Previously, the parents would arrange marriages for their children. Girls would be betrothed to boys at an early age. In effect, the young girl would become wife to a respective boy but she would wait to be officially handed over when she came of age. In some cases, the young girls so betrothed would be taken to the boy's home to grow up there. When she came of age, a ceremony would be organized to formalize the relationship. With time however the system changed. Today, the boy goes looking for a girl and without the consent of the parents and sneak with her to his home at night.
After a week or so, the girl's relatives would begin to look for her. Obviously they had some prior knowledge of her whereabouts. On discovery, a fine would be exacted from the boy. Arrangements would be made to settle the bride wealth and the marriage would be formalized.

References

External links
A Cultural Profile of the Kumam People of Uganda
THE KUMAM
Joshua Project
New Uganda
Ugandese

Ethnic groups in Uganda